Jiangbeizui CBD（) is one of the central business districts and part of Liangjiang New Area in central Chongqing, China.

The CBD aims to attract financial institutions, making it a financial centre in the future.

Jiangbeizui CBD is located by the Yangtze River, near the confluence with the Jialing River immediately across Chongqing's primary downtown core of Jiefangbei CBD. The world class Chongqing Science and Technology Museum is located here.

See also
 Jiefangbei CBD

References

Jiangbei District, Chongqing
Economy of Chongqing
Geography of Chongqing
Central business districts in China
Financial districts in China